Kachimayu (Quechua kachi salt, mayu river, "salt river", hispanicized spelling Cachimayo) is a river in Peru located in the Huancavelica Region, Huancavelica Province, on the border of the districts of Ascensión and Huancavelica.  It originates in the Chunta mountain range northwest of the peak of Antarasu near the village of Kachimayu (Cachimayo). At its confluence with the Pukapampa-Astupampa (Pucabamba-Astobamba) River, it forms the Ichhu River, which is an important affluent of the Mantaro River.

References

Rivers of Peru
Rivers of Huancavelica Region